The Greyfriars Chronicle may refer to:

Chronicle of the Greyfriars of London, commonly known as Greyfriars' Chronicle
The Grey Friars' Chronicle documenting Black Death in England
Chronicle of the Expulsion of the Greyfriars